20th Century Masters – The Millennium Collection: The Best of Sublime is a compilation album by the band Sublime. The album was released by MCA/Gasoline Alley in 2002.

Selections
The compilation contains ten songs, most of which also appear on Sublime's 1999 Greatest Hits set. The latter's "Pool Shark" and "40 Oz. to Freedom" are replaced on this release with "April 29, 1992 (Miami)" and "Greatest Hits", the latter of which is a track from the band's posthumous 1998 live album Stand by Your Van.

Reception

In a review of the album, AllMusic's Heather Phares wrote that the selected songs highlight "Sublime's dub and pop aspirations rather than their thrashy punk side"; going on to describe the album as "a decent, if small, retrospective that is worthwhile for casual fans."

Commercial performance
20th Century Masters – The Millennium Collection: The Best of Sublime peaked at number 190 on the Billboard 200 albums chart in December 2003. It was certified gold in 2005 by the Recording Industry Association of America (RIAA), denoting shipments of more than 500,000 copies sold.

Track listing

Charts

Certifications

References

Sublime
2002 greatest hits albums
MCA Records compilation albums
Sublime (band) albums